Gold Coast Rollers may refer to:

 Gold Coast Rollers (NBL), former National Basketball League team
Gold Coast Rollers (NBL1 North), NBL1 North team